Dilettante or dilettantes may refer to:

 Amateur, someone with a non-professional interest
 Dilettante (album), a 2005 album by Ali Project
 Dilettantes (album), a 2008 album by You Am I
 Dilettante Music, a classical music website with social networking features
 Dilettante Press, a now-defunct independent book publisher
 The Dilettantes, a San Francisco neo-psychedelic rock band
 The Dilettante, a 1999 French film
 A member of the Dilettante Society 

de:Dilettant